Jorge Antonio Flores Villafaña (born September 16, 1989) is an American professional soccer player who plays as a left-back.

Career

Youth
Villafaña spent part of his childhood in Pénjamo, Guanajuato, Mexico before returning to the United States for high school. He attended Anaheim High School and became captain of the soccer team. In March 2007, Villafaña won Sueño MLS, a  reality show that led to a try-out with Major League Soccer. His reality show win earned him the nickname "Sueño". Villafaña beat out around 2,000 other competitors to earn a spot on Chivas USA's U-19 squad.

Professional
Villafaña was signed by Chivas USA to a professional contract in July 2007. He made his only appearance of the season as a substitute in a 3–0 win over New York Red Bulls. He scored in 2008 season debut against D.C. United as a substitute. Villafaña made his first career start the following week against the Colorado Rapids and scored on a glancing header to seal the game for Chivas USA. Villafaña scored again the following week against the Columbus Crew. While with Chivas USA, Villafaña appeared in 86 league matches and scored 7 goals.

After the 2013 season, Villafaña was traded to the Portland Timbers. He would make 50 starts over two seasons with the Timbers. The Timbers won 2015 MLS Cup; Villafaña's performance in that victory was highlighted as strong by several analysts and commentators.

Following the triumph, Villafaña was sold to Liga MX club Santos Laguna for a reported fee of just under $1 million.

On August 8, 2018, Villafaña was re-acquired by the Portland Timbers.

On January 12, 2021, Villafaña was traded to LA Galaxy.

International
In 2007, Villafaña was called up for the United States U-20 for its trip to Buenos Aires, Argentina from November 23 to December 3. The team was part of an 11-day training camp with the U-20 squads of Paraguay, Argentina, and Uruguay. Villafaña played in all three of the U.S. games during the trip. A game tying assist against River Plate's reserves and a game-tying goal against the Argentina national under-20 team helped earn him the honor of team captain.

Villafaña appeared in all three of the U.S. games at the 2008 Campos Verde International in Beja, Portugal. Villafaña scored his second international goal against the Bolton Wanderers Reserves in a 2–0 win in Bolton, England on May 7, 2008. He assisted a goal in the U.S. 2–1 win over the Manchester United Reserves the following day.

On January 29, 2017, Villafaña made his full United States debut in a friendly against Serbia. He went on to establish himself as the USMNT's first-choice left back for the unsuccessful 2018 World Cup qualifying campaign. On March 25, he was cap-tied to the United States in a World Cup qualifying match against Honduras. In July 2017 he helped the USMNT win the CONCACAF Gold Cup with his play in several games, including starts in the semifinal 2-0 win over Costa Rica and the final 2-1 win over Jamaica.

Personal life
In November 2011, Villafaña changed his name from "Jorge Flores" to "Jorge Villafaña" opting to take his mother's maiden name as his last name.

On May 17, 2018, Jorge and his wife were robbed of over $20,000 USD in a shopping mall after exchanging currency after the first leg of the 2018 Liga MX final.

Honors
Portland Timbers
MLS Cup: 2015
Western Conference (playoffs): 2015
MLS is Back Tournament: 2020

Santos Laguna
Liga MX: Clausura 2018

United States U20
CONCACAF U-20 Championship: 2009

United States
CONCACAF Gold Cup: 2017

See also
Sueño MLS

References

External links

1989 births
Living people
American soccer players
United States men's under-20 international soccer players
United States men's under-23 international soccer players
United States men's international soccer players
American sportspeople of Mexican descent
American expatriate soccer players
Chivas USA players
Portland Timbers players
Santos Laguna footballers
Soccer players from Anaheim, California
Major League Soccer players
Liga MX players
Expatriate footballers in Mexico
2017 CONCACAF Gold Cup players
CONCACAF Gold Cup-winning players
Association football fullbacks
2009 CONCACAF U-20 Championship players
Homegrown Players (MLS)
LA Galaxy players